Saudi Arabia competed at the 2020 Summer Olympics in Tokyo. Originally scheduled to take place from 24 July to 9 August 2020, the Games were postponed to 23 July to 8 August 2021, because of the COVID-19 pandemic. It was the nation's twelfth appearance at the Summer Olympics.

Medalists

Competitors
The following is the list of number of competitors in the Games. Note that reserves in football are not counted:

Athletics

Saudi Arabian athletes further achieved the entry standards, either by qualifying time or by world ranking, in the following track and field events (up to a maximum of 3 athletes in each event):

Track & road events

Football

Summary

Men's tournament

Saudi Arabia men's football team qualified for the Olympics by advancing to the final match of the 2020 AFC U-23 Championship in Thailand, marking the country's recurrence to the sport for the first time since Atlanta 1996.

Team roster

Group play

Judo
 
Saudi Arabia qualified two judoka for the men's lightweight category (73 kg) at the Games. Rio 2016 Olympian Sulaiman Hamad accepted a continental berth from Asia as the nation's top-ranked judoka outside of direct qualifying position in the IJF World Ranking List of June 28, 2021.

Karate
 
Saudi Arabia entered one karateka into the inaugural Olympic tournament. Tareg Hamedi qualified directly for the men's kumite +75 kg category by topping the final pool round at the 2021 World Olympic Qualification Tournament in Paris, France.

Rowing

Saudi Arabia received an invitation from World Rowing to send a rower competing in the men's single sculls to the Games, as the next highest-ranked nation vying for qualification at the 2021 FISA Asia & Oceania Olympic Qualification Regatta in Tokyo, Japan.

Qualification Legend: FA=Final A (medal); FB=Final B (non-medal); FC=Final C (non-medal); FD=Final D (non-medal); FE=Final E (non-medal); FF=Final F (non-medal); SA/B=Semifinals A/B; SC/D=Semifinals C/D; SE/F=Semifinals E/F; QF=Quarterfinals; R=Repechage

Shooting

Saudi Arabia granted an invitation from ISSF to send four-time Olympian Saeed Al-Mutairi in the men's skeet shooting to the Olympics, as long as the minimum qualifying score (MQS) was fulfilled by June 6, 2021.

Swimming

Saudi Arabia received a universality invitation from FINA to send a top-ranked male swimmer in his respective individual events to the Olympics, based on the FINA Points System of June 28, 2021.

Table tennis
 
Saudi Arabia entered one athlete into the table tennis competition at the Games for the first time in 16 years. Ali Al-Khadrawi secured an outright berth in the men's singles with a gold-medal victory at the 2020 West Asia Olympic Qualification Tournament in Amman, Jordan.

Weightlifting

Saudi Arabia entered one male weightlifter into the Olympic competition. Mahmoud Al-Humayd accepted a spare berth unused by the Tripartite Commission as the next highest-ranked weightlifter vying for qualification in the men's 73 kg category based on the IWF Absolute World Rankings.

References

Nations at the 2020 Summer Olympics
2020
2021 in Saudi Arabian sport